The Roman Catholic Diocese of Montería is a diocese located in the city of Montería in the Ecclesiastical province of Cartagena in Colombia.

History
 20 November 1954: Established as Diocese of Montería from the Metropolitan Archdiocese of Cartagena and Apostolic Vicariate of San Jorge

Ordinaries
Rubén Isaza Restrepo (1956.11.04 – 1959.11.02) Appointed, Bishop of Ibagué
José de Jesús Pimiento Rodríguez (1959.12.30 – 1964.02.29) Appointed, Bishop of Garzón-Neiva; future Cardinal
Miguel Antonio Medina y Medina (1964.03.23 – 1972.05.20)
Samuel Silverio Buitrago Trujillo, C.M. (1972.12.18 – 1976.10.11) Appointed, Archbishop of Popayán
Carlos José Ruiseco Vieira (1977.03.28 – 1983.09.23) Appointed, Archbishop of Cartagena
Ramón Darío Molina Jaramillo, O.F.M. (1984.03.23 – 2001.01.19) Appointed, Bishop of Neiva
Julio César Vidal Ortiz (2001.10.31 – 2011.07.16) Appointed, Bishop of Cúcuta
Ramón Alberto Rolón Güepsa (2012.10.27 – present)

See also
Roman Catholicism in Colombia

Sources

External links
 Catholic Hierarchy
 GCatholic.org

Roman Catholic dioceses in Colombia
Roman Catholic Ecclesiastical Province of Cartagena
Christian organizations established in 1954
Roman Catholic dioceses and prelatures established in the 20th century